This article comprises three sortable tables of the significant mountain peaks of Missouri. This article defines a significant mountain peak as a summit with at least  of topographic prominence, and a major summit as a summit with at least  of topographic prominence.  All summits in this article have at least 100 meters of topographic prominence. An ultra-prominent summit is a summit with at least  of topographic prominence.

The summit of a mountain or hill may be measured in three principal ways:
The topographic elevation of a summit measures the height of the summit above a geodetic sea level. The first table below ranks the 20 highest summits of Missouri by elevation.
The topographic prominence of a summit is a measure of how high the summit rises above its surroundings. The second table below ranks the 20 most prominent summits of Missouri.
The topographic isolation (or radius of dominance) of a summit measures how far the summit lies from its nearest point of equal elevation. The third table below ranks the 50 most isolated major summits of Missouri.



Highest significant summits

Of these 9 peaks, 4 are located in Iron County, 2 in St. Francois County, 1 in Webster County, 1 in Reynolds County, and 1 in Madison County.

Most prominent summits

Most isolated significant summits

Notes

References

 
Missouri
Mountain peaks